Toyotsu Station (豊津駅) is the name of two train stations in Japan:

 Toyotsu Station (Fukuoka)
 Toyotsu Station (Osaka)